Alexander Lapin (17 May 1945 – 25 October 2012), also known as Alesander Lupin, was a Russian photographer.

His work is included in the collection of the Museum of Fine Arts Houston, the Zimmerli Art Museum at Rutgers University and the Museum of Contemporary Photography.

References

1945 births
2012 deaths
20th-century Russian photographers
21st-century Russian photographers
20th-century Russian artists
21st-century Russian artists